In Kabbalah, Eisheth Zenunim (Heb. אֵשֶׁת זְנוּנִים, "Woman of Whoredom") is a princess of the Qliphoth who rules Gamaliel, the order of the Qliphoth of Yesod. She is found in Zohar 1:5a as a feminine personification of sin.  In Jewish mythology, she is said to eat the souls of the damned.

In popular culture 
In Jacqueline Carey's Kushiel's Legacy saga, Eisheth is one of eight angels who follow Elua. She was noted for being gentle. In the series, she is noted as the patron angel of music, medicine, and art, and associated with the sea. Her province is Eisande.

See also
Many Waters

References

Individual angels
Angels in Judaism
Qliphoth
Female legendary creatures
Mythological princesses